Physocephalatidira is a parvorder of plankton in the sub-order Hyperiidea. It is the only taxon within the infraorder Physocephalata, making its parent a monotypic taxon.

References 

Amphipoda
Animals described in 1973